AMC-16 is an American communications satellite. Owned by SES Americom, AMC-16 was designed to be placed in geostationary orbit, following launch on a Atlas V space vehicle.

Satellite description 
Built by Lockheed Martin and based on the A2100AXS satellite bus, AMC-16 is located at 85° West longitude for EchoStar. AMC-16 has 24 Ku-band and 12 Ka-band transponders covering United States (including Hawaii and Alaska), part of Canada and Mexico. Leased to Echostar Satellite Services.

Launch 
It was launched atop a Atlas V launch vehicle at 12:07:00 UTC on 17 December 2004, from SLC-41 at the Cape Canaveral in Florida. AMC-16 is completely leased to EchoStar Satellite Services.

See also 

 2004 in spaceflight

References 

Spacecraft launched in 2004
SES satellites
Satellites using the A2100 bus